Aslan Karatsev and Andrey Rublev were the defending champions but chose not to participate.

Wesley Koolhof and Neal Skupski won the title, defeating Rohan Bopanna and Denis Shapovalov in the final, 7–6(7–4), 6–1.

Seeds

Draw

Draw

References

External links
Main draw

Qatar ExxonMobil Open - Doubles
Qatar Open (tennis)